William Boyne Howell (13 July 1883 – 18 February 1960) was a New Zealand cricketer who played first-class cricket for Canterbury from 1902 to 1919.

Howell was a left-arm medium pace bowler and right-handed tail-end batsman. His best bowling figures were 6 for 50 and 7 for 32 in Canterbury's victory over Wellington in 1902–03. He also represented South Island in two matches.

References

External links
 
 

1883 births
1960 deaths
New Zealand cricketers
Canterbury cricketers
Cricketers from Christchurch
South Island cricketers